Tarbor may refer to:
 Tarbor-e Jafari
 Tarbor-e Lay Bisheh
 Tarbor-e Sadat